Vassos is both a surname and a given name. Notable people by that name include:

Surname
 John Vassos (1898–1985), American industrial designer and artist
 Timoleon Vassos (1836–1929), Greek Army officer and general

Given name
 Vassos Alexander, British sports reporter
 Vassos Karageorghis (born 1929), Cypriot archaeologist
 Vassos Lyssarides (1920–2021), Cypriot politician and physician
 Vassos Melanarkitis (born 1972), Cypriot former footballer
 Vassos Shiarly (born 1948), British Cypriot banker

Cypriot culture